Fengdeng (Xiao'erjing: فٍْ‌دٍْ جٍ‎) is a town under the administration of Jinfeng District, Yinchuan, Ningxia, China. , it has 8 villages under its administration.

References 

Township-level divisions of Ningxia
Yinchuan